William Horner may refer to:
 William George Horner, British mathematician
 William Horner (cricketer), English cricketer
 Billy Horner, English footballer and manager

See also
 George William Horner, British biblical scholar